Dave Green (born 1959) is an astrophysicist at the Cavendish Laboratory in Cambridge, UK and University Senior Lecturer at the University of Cambridge. He is also a Fellow of Churchill College, where he a Director of Studies for Physics. His research focuses on supernova remnants (SNRs), including studies of G1.9+0.3 the youngest Galactic SNR yet identified, and he has written a book on the historical supernovae along with F. Richard Stephenson.

His sporting interests include coxing, cricket and croquet.

External links
 Dave Green's homepage
 Dave Green's "Other Homepage"
 Historical Supernovae and Their Remnants by D.A. Green and F.R. Stephenson
 Dave Green Facts

1959 births
Living people
British astrophysicists
21st-century British astronomers
Fellows of Churchill College, Cambridge
Alumni of Churchill College, Cambridge
Alumni of Robinson College, Cambridge
Place of birth missing (living people)